Paul Charles François Adrien Henri Dieudonné Thiébault (14 December 1769, Berlin - 14 October 1846, Paris) was a general who fought in Napoleon I's army. During his military career he wrote a number of histories and memoirs, the last of which were published in 1895.

Life
His father was Dieudonné Thiébault, a professor in the military school in Berlin and a friend of Frederick II of Prussia. Paul Thiébault moved to France and took up an administrative post, which he remained in until 20 August 1792. On that date he volunteered for the Butte des Moulins battalion, but was invalided out on health grounds the following November. He was implicated in treason accusations aimed at Charles François Dumouriez on 4 April 1793 but succeeded in proving his innocence and rejoined the army, at first in the Armée du Rhin then in the Armée du Nord until 1794. Rising rapidly through the ranks, he was made adjutant to general Solignac in the armée d’Italie in 1795.

He served at the Battle of Rivoli, distinguished himself in the assault on Naples in January 1799 and then retired the following June. Recalled in January 1800, he was attached to the armée d’Italie, where he served on Masséna's staff at the siege of Genoa. He was made a general in 1801 and commanded the 2nd brigade of the 1st infantry division at Austerlitz, in support of Vandamme, making him part of the army corps which mounted the assault and took the Pratzen plateau. He was wounded during the battle.

He was then made governor of Fulda in October 1806. Next he was transferred to the French army in Portugal, then in Spain, where he remained until 1813. In May 1810 he was made governor of Salamanca and in 1811 of Vieille-Castille. During his time in the Peninsula he also became a divisional general (1808), then a baron (1813). He was then moved to Germany, where he commanded first 40st. and then 50st. infantry division at Hamburg then Lubeck between 1813 and 1814, under the command of Davout. He backed Napoleon during the Hundred Days and was put in command of the defence of Paris. Published in 1895, with an English translation appearing the next year, his memoirs are a useful source for the history of the First French Empire, filling in details and giving often critical assessments of major figures.

Family
His father is Dieudonné Thiébault.

Thiébault married Betsy Walker the daughter of the novelist Lady Mary Hamilton. His son Adolphe (1797-1875) became a military tutor and antiquities collector. Adolphe gathered together the family's papers and these are available at Yale University.

Works 
 Journal des opérations militaires du siège et du blocus de Gênes, written in 1801
 Relation de l’expédition  du Portugal faite en 1807 et 1808
 Manuel général du service des états-majors généraux et divisionnaires dans les armées
 Mémoires
 Memoirs of Baron Thiébault (transl. by A. J. Butler), London, 1896
 Du chant, et particulièrement de la romance, 1813

References

French generals
French military personnel of the French Revolutionary Wars
French commanders of the Napoleonic Wars
Military personnel from Berlin
1769 births
1846 deaths
Burials at Père Lachaise Cemetery
Names inscribed under the Arc de Triomphe